Muhammad Younis Butt is a Pakistani screenwriter and humorist notable for his shows.

He is also a column writer and executive producer. His most popular show is Hum Sab Umeed Sai Hain. Most of his TV shows were derived from his writings. His current show is Hum Sab Ajeeb Se Hain which is being broadcast on Aaj Entertainment.

Early life
Muhammad Younis Butt was born on 4 January 1962 in Gujranwala, Punjab, Pakistan. After finishing his basic education, he received his MBBS (Bachelor of Medicine, Bachelor of Surgery) from King Edward Medical College, Lahore. During his student life, he was involved in many dramatic/theater-based activities and even started working on his comedy books while he was a college student.

Professional career
His first most popular drama, as a writer, was Family Front. This play won the Nigar Award in 2000. It was the one of the few humor shows of the time when there was only PTV available in Pakistan. His later work  Hum Sab Umeed Sai Hain is one of the most popular shows in Pakistan. In March 2012, Younis Butt left Geo News and joined Dunya TV. It has its own Bas Kar Awards. Ladies Park a comedy show of Geo TV was written by him. Nowadays, His current sitcom show Hum Sab Ajeeb Se Hain is running successfully on Aaj Entertainment.

Writings
His books include:
 Family Front – Award-winning popular drama on PTV
 Hum Sab Umeed Sai Hain – Pakistani TV show with political humor on Geo TV 
 Hum Sab Ajeeb Se Hain - A family entertainment & humor Drama on Aaj Entertainment 
Romeo Weds Heer
Shahrukh Ki Saaliyan (2019)
Barfi Laddu (2019)
 2011 Mehngai Awards – A political humor award show aired on Geo TV.
 Double Trouble (book)
 Butt Tamiziyan
 Kharmastiyaan
 Laaf Park
 Ladies Park
 Gharmastiyyan
 MisFit (2001)
 Yeh Duniya Hai Dil Walon Ki - Popular Pakistani song for 2011 ICC Cricket World Cup sung by Ali Zafar
 Khundkariyaan
 Aks Bar Aks
 Hawaiyaan
 Shaitaniyaan
 Noke Joke
 Tu Tu Main Main
 Mazahiyaat
 Khunda Zan
 Mazah Bakhair
 Joke Dar Joke
 Afrah Tafreeh
 Butt Soortiyaan
 Butt Paray
 Mazah Pursi
 Ghuldasta
 Dil lagi (2003-2005) PTV
 Kallabaziyaan
 Batt Kariyaan
 Mazah Gardi
 Dino Ki Dulhaniya (2017)
S.H.E comedy drama on GEO tv 
MissFire comedy on geo tv

Awards and honors
 He was awarded the Nigar Award for Family Front.
 The Bus Kar Awards, which are Hum Sab Umeed Sai Hain's own awards, have been held twice for the performers of Hum Sab Umeed Sai Hain.
Ptv world award 1999 
For family front
Graduate film awards 2001-2

References

1962 births
Living people
Pakistani humorists
Urdu-language humorists
Pakistani dramatists and playwrights
Punjabi people
Pakistani people of Kashmiri descent
20th-century Pakistani physicians
King Edward Medical University alumni